{{Speciesbox
|name = dwarf bog-rush
|image = Schoenus maschalinus Roth ex Roem. and Schult. (AM AK292849-2).jpg
|image_caption = 
|taxon = Schoenus maschalinus
|authority = Roem. & Schult.
|synonyms_ref =
|synonyms =
 <small>Chaetospora axillaris R.Br.</small>
}}Schoenus maschalinus, the dwarf bog-rush is a sedge native to Australia, New Zealand and Malesia. A small, creeping grass like herb, often forming a mat. Stems grow from 10 to 20 cm long. Leaves are usually less than 1mm wide. The habitat is mostly moist swampy areas not far from the coast. The specific epithet maschalinus'' is derived from Greek, referring to the presence of axils, literally "armpits".

References 

maschalinus
Plants described in 1810
Flora of New South Wales
Flora of Victoria (Australia)
Flora of Queensland
Flora of Tasmania
Flora of Western Australia
Flora of South Australia
Flora of the Northern Territory
Flora of New Zealand
Flora of Malesia
Flora of the Mariana Islands
Flora of the Chatham Islands